Shanghai Bright Ubest Women's Volleyball Club is a Chinese professional women's volleyball team based in Shanghai that plays in the Chinese Volleyball League. The team has won five league titles altogether. Their head coach is Wang Zhiteng. They were sponsored by Guohua Life and Dunlop, and are now sponsored by Bright Food (Group) Co., Ltd and Bright Dairy & Food Cop., Ltd.

CVL results

Team roster of Season 2019/20

Team roster of Season 2018/19

Team roster of Season 14/15

Career titles 
Chinese Volleyball League

AVC Club Championship

Former players 
  Zhang Jing (1996-2008)
  Wang Yi (1996-1999)
  Li Yizhi (1996-2002)
  Zhu Yunying (1996–2002)
  He Qing (2001-2009)
  Heather Bown (2013-2014)
  Nellie Spicer (2013-2014)
  Kinga Kasprzak (2013-2014)
  Margareta Kozuch (2014-2015)
  Senna Ušić-Jogunica (2014-2016)
  Sarah Pavan (2015-2017)
  Helena Havelkova (2016-2017)
  Kim Yeon-koung (2017-2018, 2021-22)
  Louisa Lippmann (2019-2021)

Head coaches
Note: The following list may not be complete.
  Zhang Liming (????–1996)
  Zhang Jichen (1996–1997)
  Cai Bin (1997–2002)
  Yu Youwei (2002–2003)
  Zhang Liming (2003–2013)
  Wang Jian (2013–2014)
  He Jiong (2014–2015)
  Wang Zhiteng (2015–)

See also
Shanghai Men's Volleyball Club

References

Chinese volleyball clubs
Sport in Shanghai
Women's volleyball teams